Karoh Peak is a  tall mountain peak in the Sivalik Hills range of greater Himalayas range located near Morni Hills area of Panchkula district, Haryana, India. It is highest point in the state of Haryana

The British rulers had incorrectly recorded the height to be 1499 meters in The Imperial Gazetteer of India but later measurements by the Survey of India found the actual height to be about 100 feet lower and official height was revised down.

See also 

 Morni Hills, Panchkula district, 1267 m peak
 Dhosi Hill, Narnaul - Hill of Chyavana Rishi creator of Chyawanprash, 740 m peak
 Tosham, 240 m average elevation
 Madhogarh, Haryana, 214 m average elevation
 Monuments of National Importance in Haryana
 State Protected Monuments in Haryana
 National Parks & Wildlife Sanctuaries of Haryana
 India cave temples
 Caves in India
 Rock-cut temples in India
 Indian rock-cut architecture
Indus Valley Civilisation sites 
Highest point of Indian states and territories 
List of mountains in India
 Haryana Tourism

References

External links
 Photos of Karoh Deota temple and archaeological ruins on the Karoh peak

Mountains of the Himalayas
Mountains of Haryana
Highest points of Indian states and union territories
One-thousanders of Asia
Sarasvati River
Hindu pilgrimage sites in India
Hindu temples in Haryana
Archaeological sites in Haryana
Rebuilt buildings and structures in India
Tourist attractions in Haryana